Namık Kemal (21 December 1840 – 2 December 1888) was an Ottoman democrat, writer, intellectual, reformer, journalist, playwright, and political activist who was influential in the formation of the Young Ottomans and their struggle for governmental reform in the Ottoman Empire during the late Tanzimat period, which would lead to the First Constitutional Era in the Empire in 1876. Kemal was particularly significant for championing the notions of freedom and fatherland in his numerous plays and poems, and his works would have a powerful impact on the establishment of and future reform movements in Turkey, as well as other former Ottoman lands. He is often regarded as being instrumental in redefining Western concepts like natural rights and constitutional government.

Early years

An Ottoman Turkish citizen, Namık Kemal was born in Tekirdağ (then part of the Ottoman Empire, today in Turkey) on 21 December 1840, to his mother Fatma Zehra Hanım (who had ethnic Albanian ancestors)  and father Mustafa Asım Bey (who was the chief astrologer in the Sultan's Palace, and whose family was originally from Yenişehir in Bursa Province). Since surnames or family names were not in use during the Ottoman Empire, "Kemal" was not his surname, but part of his first name. During his youth, Kemal traveled throughout the Ottoman Empire, staying in Constantinople, Kars, and Sofia, and studied a number of subjects, including poetry. In 1857, at the age of 17, Kemal worked in the Tercüme Odası ("The Translation Office") of the government. However, as a result of the political nature of his writings, Kemal was forced to leave this job by Grand Vizier Mehmed Emin Âli Pasha and so joined his friend and fellow Young Ottoman, İbrahim Şinasi, on his newspaper Tasvir-i Efkar ("Herald of Ideas"). Kemal worked on Tasvir-i Efkar until his exile and flight to Paris in 1867.

Political career

Young Ottomans
The Young Ottomans were a group of political activists whose members came principally from the young elite of Ottoman society.  The major goal of this group was to institute political reform according to the Western ideas of representative government.

After joining the Young Ottomans in 1862, Kemal continually wrote essays on the subjects of political, administrative, social, and foreign policy reform. In 1864, Kemal took over the pro-reform newspaper Tasvir-i Efkar after its previous owner and Kemal's friend İbrahim Şinasi was forced into exile. In 1868, after being forced to seek refuge in Paris, Kemal began to handle the publication of the newspaper Hürriyet ("Liberty"), which also espoused the purpose of the Young Ottomans. Kemal's papers rapidly became a popular venue for Young Ottomans to express their anti-sultanate and pro-parliamentary sentiments. However, as a result of their outspokenness, many Young Ottomans were, like Kemal, forced to flee the empire and seek refuge in Western Europe.

Namık Kemal admired the constitution of the French Third Republic, he summed up the Young Ottomans' political ideals as "the sovereignty of the nation, the separation of powers, the responsibility of officials, personal freedom, equality, freedom of thought, freedom of press, freedom of association, enjoyment of property, sanctity of the home".

Namık Kemal drew on the parliamentary constitution of United Kingdom, in preference to that of France which, under Napoleon III, he considered too authoritarian. London on the other hand, with its "indomitable power of public opinion against authority" he saw as the "model of the world" in political principles.

Ideology and exile

Namık Kemal was heavily influenced by Western conceptions of the relationship between the government and the people. As such, he and his compatriots spoke out against the movement to centralize the government being undertaken by Sultan Abdülaziz (ruled 1861–1876), and his advisors Mehmed Emin Âli Pasha and Mehmed Fuad Pasha. As a result of his criticism of the government, Namık Kemal was exiled from the Ottoman Empire in 1867 and fled to Paris where many other exiled Young Ottomans had found refuge.

In 1869 or 1870, Kemal was allowed to return to Constantinople and proceeded to write for a number of Young Ottoman-run newspapers, and eventually published one of his own, Ibret ("Admonition"), in which he addressed more intellectual, social, and national subjects. One of the newspapers he contributed to during this period was Basiret.

In addition, it was after his return to Constantinople that Kemal wrote his most significant and influential work: the play Vatan Yahut Silistre, which translates to "Homeland or Silistra." The play tells the story of an Ottoman soldier whose loyalty to his nation, and not his religion or allegiance to the Sultan, motivates him to defend the town of Silistra, Bulgaria from the Russians during the Crimean War. The impact these nationalist sentiments, unheard of in the Ottoman Empire prior to Kemal, had on the Turkish people was so profound that Kemal's newspaper, Ibret, was shut down, and Kemal himself was banished from the Empire for the second time. During this second exile, Kemal took refuge in Cyprus, in a building known as the Namık Kemal Dungeon in Famagusta, where he remained for three years between 1873 and 1876.

His masterpiece, "Ode to Freedom" summarizes his political views.

Later career

Like many Young Ottomans, Namık Kemal supported Murad V’s ascension to the throne after the abdication of Abdülaziz in 1876. However, their hope that Murad would institute the reforms they desired was dashed, for it rapidly became apparent that he was not suited for rule; his weak nerves and alcoholism leading to his abdication after only three months. Namık Kemal protested against Murad’s deposition, and continued to support Murad's Western political perspectives, but ultimately, his pleas failed to have any effect and Murad V stepped down in 1876.

Despite Murad's abdication, the first Ottoman Parliament, the General Assembly of the Ottoman Empire, was established in 1876, largely as a result of pressure from the Young Ottomans, as well as Midhat Pasha’s political influence. However, while, at first, Abdul Hamid II, the sultan who succeeded Murad V, was willing to allow Parliament to function, he quickly decided that it was easier for him to enact reform by seizing autocratic powers instead of waiting for the approval of elected officials. In order to successfully implement his autocratic rule, Abdul Hamid II exiled many Young Ottomans, including Namık Kemal, who were critical of his decision to disregard the Parliament. Thus, for the third time, Kemal was removed from Constantinople by being forced into an administrative position in Chios, where he would die in 1888.

Legacy

Namık Kemal had an enormous influence on the formation of a Turkish national identity. Kemal's focus on national loyalty, rather than loyalty to a monarch (influenced, as it was, by Western European ideals of self-government) contributed not only to the spread of democracy during the early 20th century, but also to the formation of the modern Republic of Turkey after the dissolution of the Ottoman Empire. The founder of modern Turkey, Mustafa Kemal Atatürk, often remarked that he had been influenced by Kemal's writing as a young man, and that they had subsequently been a source of inspiration for his goals in the formation of the Turkish government and state.

Bibliography

Novels 
 İntibah yahut Ali Beyin sergüzeşiti (1874), (Awakening, or, Ali Bey’s Experiences)
 Cezmi (1887/88), a historical novel based on the life of a 16th-century khan of the Crimean Tatars

Drama
 Vatan yahut Silistre 
 Akif Bey
 Gülnihal
 Kara Bela
 Zavallı Çocuk
 Celaleddin Harzemşah

See also
 Namık Kemal University
 Namık Kemal House Museum
 Nam-ı Kemal jokes

References

External links

19th-century journalists from the Ottoman Empire
19th-century poets from the Ottoman Empire
Dramatists and playwrights from the Ottoman Empire
1840 births
1888 deaths
Male journalists
Social reformers
19th-century dramatists and playwrights
Male poets from the Ottoman Empire
Male dramatists and playwrights
19th-century male writers
Albanians from the Ottoman Empire
Turkish democracy activists